A Homespun Vamp is a 1922 American silent drama film directed by Frank O'Connor and written by Harvey F. Thew and Hector Turnbull. The film stars May McAvoy, Darrell Foss, Lincoln Stedman, Josephine Crowell, Charles Stanton Ogle, Guy Oliver and Helen Dunbar. The film was released on February 12, 1922, by Paramount Pictures.

Plot
As described in a film magazine, Meg Mackenzie (McAvoy) is the orphaned niece of two crabbed, stingy old men, Donald (Ogle) and Duncan Craig (Oliver), brothers in a small country town. They force her to become engaged to Joe Dobbs (Stedman), assistant to his mother (Crowell) who runs the village blacksmith shop. Stephen Ware (Foss), who is writing a novel in a shack nearby, is accused of robbing the post office and hides in the Craig home overnight while the two brothers are away. When the brothers return, they force Meg to marry Stephen at once. The real burglar is discovered and Stephen's name is cleared. Meg discovers that she actually loves Stephen, and wins him away from Beatrice Carlisle (Kirkham), a young woman he had been engaged to. She also gives him the inspiration for the concluding chapter in his novel.

Cast
May McAvoy as Meg Mackenzie
Darrell Foss as Stephen Ware
Lincoln Stedman as Joe Dobbs
Josephine Crowell as Mrs. Dobbs
Charles Stanton Ogle as Donald Craig
Guy Oliver as Duncan Craig
Helen Dunbar as Mrs. Ware
Kathleen Kirkham as Beatrice Carlisle

Preservation status
A Homespun Vamp is now lost.

References

External links 

1922 films
1920s English-language films
Silent American drama films
1922 drama films
Lost American films
Paramount Pictures films
American black-and-white films
American silent feature films
1922 lost films
Lost drama films
Films directed by Frank O'Connor
1920s American films